Class A: General Works is a classification used by the United States Library of Congress Classification system. This article outlines the subclasses of Class A.

AC – collections. series. collected works 
1–999......Collections; Series; Collected works
1–195..........Collections of monographs, essays, etc.
1–8...........American and English
9-195.......Other languages
200.............Collections for Jewish readers
801–895......Inaugural and program dissertations
901–995......Pamphlet collections
999.............Scrapbooks

AE – encyclopedias 
1–(90)......Encyclopedias
5–(90)......By language

AG – dictionaries and other general reference works 
2–600......Dictionaries and other general reference works

AI – indexes 
1–21......Indexes

AM – museums; collectors and collecting 
1–(501)......Museums; Collectors and collecting
10–100........By country
111–160.......Museology. Museum methods, technique, etc.
200–(501)......Collectors and collecting

AN – newspapers 
AN......Newspapers

AP – periodicals 
1-(271)......Periodicals
101–115...........Humorous periodicals
200–230...........Juvenile periodicals
(250)–(265)......Periodicals for women
(270)–(271)......Periodicals for Blacks

AS – academies and learned societies 
1–945......Academics and learned societies
2.5-4.........International associations, congresses, conferences, etc.
11–785......By region or country

AY – yearbooks; almanacs; directories 
10–2001......Yearbooks; Almanacs; Directories
10–29..........Annuals
30-1730......Almanacs
2001............Directories. General works on the compilation of directories, etc.

AZ – history of scholarship and learning; the humanities 
(20)–999......History of scholarship and learning; the humanities
101–(181)......Philosophy; Theory
191–193.........Evaluation
200–361.........History
501–908.........By region or country

References

Further reading 
 Full schedule of all LCC Classifications

A